Satyadhyana Tirtha  (24 December 1872 – 24 March 1942)  was an Indian Hindu philosopher, scholar, yogi, mystic, theologian and saint. He was the 38th pontiff of Uttaradi Math and served the pontificate from 1911-1942. He was considered most active and zealous pontiffs of 20th century. He was an untiring propagandist, the best debater of his days and almost a terror to his adversaries in philosophical polemics. It was at his initiative and inspiration that a splendid Marathi translation of Madhva's  Brahmasutra Bhashya, with the Tatvaprakashika of Jayatirtha was published for the benefit of a large number of followers of Madhvacharya in Maharashtra. He made extensive tours all over India, held disputations and published polemical tracts and phamplets in many languages in North and South India for free distribution. He started, Sriman Madhva Siddhanta Abhivruddhikarini Sabha around 1905-06 and registered in 1930 to promote the study of Sanskrit literature and philosophy, particularly the study of Dvaita Philosophy, to hold meetings and conferences of Madhva scholars.

Biography
Satyadhyana Tirtha was born into an ancient Deshastha Madhva Brahmin family  of erudite scholars on 24 December 1872 in a village called Chikodi in Karnataka to Korlahalli Jayaramacharya (Purvashrama name of Satyadhira Tirtha's father) and Krishna Bai. Satyadhyana Tirtha's purvashrama name was 
Korlahalli Sethuramacharya. His father Satyadhira Tirtha was 37th pontiff of Uttaradi Matha. Satyadhyana Tirtha had wide experience in the administration of the mutt, for many years as the diwan of the mutt. He was a shrewd judge of men and things. He had a keen sense of humour and had a ready way of putting everyone at ease with him. He was always accessible to students, scholars and those interested in philosophical problems. He appreciated Sāstraic learning wherever it was found, irrespective of sectarian affiliations. He had a knack of discovering hidden talent in the younger generation and inspired many young scholars who had taken University degrees in Sanskrit and Philosophy with a zest for research work in Vedanta. He championed the cause of Dvaita Vedanta for more than a quarter of century and made a deep and lasting impression on the world of traditional scholarship in Vedanta, by his tours and disputations and by his publications, distributed free all around. At the famous Dvaita-Advaita debate in Kumbakonam in 1929-30, he made history by engaging some of the veteran scholars of advaita headed by Anantha Krishna Shastri and forcing them all to retreat in despair. He engaged leading men of his day like Bal Gangadhar Tilak in philosophical debate; and founded a chair of Dvaita Vedanta and an endowment for the publication of Dvaita works written by North Indian authors, at the Benares Sanskrit College and edited Abhinavagada, Advaitakalanala, and other controversial classics. He gave sumptuous encouragement to scholars of all schools of thought and used to hold annual sabhas of scholars at Tirupati, and elsewhere, to examine and reward scholars in various branches of learning. He was foremost of the pontiffs of Hinduism. He travelled all over India many times, visiting great centers of traditional learning and places of religious importance like Benares, Gaya and Dwaraka in north and places in the south. He created a countrywide revival of interest on Madhva Siddhāntha and raised the prestige of the system in the estimation of the followers of other schools of Vedanta. He made a deep impression on the contemporary philosophical life, by his magnetic personality and by his untiring energy and drive. Satyadhyana Tirtha ruled the pontificate for 31 years. After his death on 24 March 1942, his mortal remains were enshrined in the mutt at Pandharpur in Maharashtra. He was succeeded by Satyaprajna Tirtha.

Works
Satyadhyana Tīrtha authored many works consisting of polemical tracts, commentaries on the works of Madhva and Jayatirtha. His Chandrikamandanam is a refutation of Ramasubba Shastri of Thiruvisanallur's critique of Tatparyachandrika of Vyasatirtha.

List of Notable works
The following are his notable works:

Sanskrit
Gitasarasangraha
Gitapradhipadarthachadrika
Bheda Paranyeva Khalu Brahma Sutrani
Chandrikamandanam
Gita Vimarsha
Brahma Sutra Vimarsha
Advaita Branti Prakasha
Gita Lekhana Mala
Bhasma Dharana Nisheda tathaa Urdhvapundra Dharanam
Sudarshana Mahatmya

Kannada
Sabhasara Sangraha Part I (civil suit), II and III
Geethopanyasagalu

References

Bibliography

External links
Candrikāmaṇḍanam (Sanskrit)

Madhva religious leaders
Dvaita Vedanta
Dvaitin philosophers
Uttaradi Math
20th-century Indian philosophers
Indian Hindu saints